Cecina railway station is an Italian railway station on the Tirrenica railway line in Tuscany.

History
It opened on 20 October 1863 with a northern section of the Tirrenica line, and opened on the same day as the Cecina-Volterra railway. After significant damage to the station building during the Second World War, the station building was rebuilt. From 2020 to 2021, the station was subject to a renovation, during which the platforms were raised and the underpass was upgraded.

Train services and movements
Regular passenger services to the station are regionale, regionale veloce, Intercity and Frecciabianca services, that use the Tirrenica line to connect to Pisa Centrale, Roma Termini, Grosseto, Florence SMN, Piombino and further afield such as Genova.

Gallery

See also

History of rail transport in Italy
List of railway stations in Tuscany
Rail transport in Italy
Railway stations in Italy

References 

Railway stations in Tuscany
1863 establishments in Italy
Railway stations opened in 1863
Cecina, Tuscany
Railway stations in Italy opened in the 19th century